Kari Aalvik Grimsbø (born 4 January 1985) is a former Norwegian handball player who last played for Győri Audi ETO KC and the Norwegian national team. Since her retirement she is the goalkeeping coach at Byåsen HE.

Career
Aalvik Grimsbø played her first match for the senior national team in September 2005 against Portugal. Previously she had played for Norway in the junior European and World Championships.

Before she joined Byåsen, she played for the clubs Orkdal and Børsa/Skaun. She joined to Győri Audi ETO in January 2015, she signed a contract for 2 and a half years. As she stated about the contract: "It is a great opportunity for me, and when such an opportunity arises, it is hard to say no. It’s a dream coming true." In November 2016 she extended her contract with 3 more years. "There is a great team in Győr at the moment, I'm glad, that I can play here for at least three more years. It is really important for me, that I can play at the highest level with Audi ETO and I can prepare for the 2020 Olympic Games."

In 2018 she announced her temporary retirement from the Norwegian national team. For the qualification games to the Summer Olympics, her return to the national team was announced on Feb 28, 2020.  On 30 April 2020, she announced her retirement.

Achievements
Olympic Games:
Winner: 2008, 2012
Bronze Medalist: 2016
World Championship:
Winner: 2011, 2015
Silver Medalist: 2007, 2017
Bronze Medalist: 2009
European Championship:
Winner: 2006, 2008, 2010, 2014, 2016
EHF Champions League:
Winner: 2017, 2018, 2019
Silver Medalist: 2016
Nemzeti Bajnokság I
Winner: 2016, 2017, 2018, 2019
Magyar Kupa
Winner: 2015, 2016, 2018, 2019

Individual awards
All-Star Goalkeeper of the Summer Olympics: 2012 and 2016
 All-Star Team Best Goalkeeper of the EHF Champions League: 2016, 2017, 2018
 MVP of the EHF Champions League Final Four: 2019

Personal
She is married. She gave birth to her son, Sindre in June 2013.

References

Norwegian female handball players
Sportspeople from Bergen
People from Sør-Trøndelag
Handball players at the 2008 Summer Olympics
Olympic handball players of Norway
Olympic gold medalists for Norway
Olympic bronze medalists for Norway
1985 births
Living people
Olympic medalists in handball
Norwegian expatriate sportspeople in Denmark
Norwegian expatriate sportspeople in Hungary
Expatriate handball players
Handball players at the 2012 Summer Olympics
Handball players at the 2016 Summer Olympics
Medalists at the 2008 Summer Olympics
Medalists at the 2012 Summer Olympics
Medalists at the 2016 Summer Olympics
Győri Audi ETO KC players